Area code 216 is the telephone area code in the North American Numbering Plan (NANP) for the city of Cleveland and most of its inner-ring suburbs in Cuyahoga County of the U.S. state of Ohio. The area code is one of the original North American area codes established in 1947.

The first nationwide telephone numbering plan of 1947 divided Ohio into four numbering plan areas (NPAs), roughly forming a quadrant layout for telecommunication services in the state. Area code 216 was assigned to the northeastern part, comprising the area from Lorain to Youngstown.

In 1996, the southern portion, including Akron, Canton, and Youngstown, received area code 330, while the eastern and western portions were assigned area code 440 in 1997. The boundary between 216 and 440 was drawn in such a way that 440 is barely contiguous; the two portions of 440 are only joined by a small section in the south.

Despite covering a major urban area, a second area code should not be needed until around 2038 based on projections made in 2022.

Service area

 Beachwood
 Bratenahl
 Brook Park
 Brooklyn
 Brooklyn Heights
 Cleveland
 Cleveland Heights
 Cuyahoga Heights
 East Cleveland
 Euclid
 Garfield Heights
 Highland Hills
 Hunting Valley
 Independence
 Lakewood
 Linndale
 Maple Heights
 Middleburg Heights
 Moreland Hills
 Newburgh Heights
 North Olmsted
 North Randall
 Orange
 Parma
 Parma Heights
 Pepper Pike
 Richmond Heights
 Seven Hills
 Shaker Heights
 South Euclid
 University Heights
 Valley View
 Warrensville Heights
 Woodmere

See also

List of Ohio area codes
List of NANP area codes

References

External links

 List of exchanges from AreaCodeDownload.com, 216 Area Code

Telecommunications-related introductions in 1947
216
216
Cuyahoga County, Ohio